Li Yan (Chinese:李彦) (born June 20, 1980) is a former Chinese international football  midfielder who  spent the majority of his career playing for Shanghai Pudong where he won the second tier division title and a runners-up position in the 2003 Chinese Jia-A League season. He also played for New Zealand Knights FC and Hangzhou Greentown before retiring due to injury.

Club career
While Li Yan started his football career at second tier side Shanghai HSBC, it was his move to Shanghai Pudong that saw his football career flourish when he would go on to establish himself as an integral member within the team that would go on to win the second division title and receive promotion to the top tier. He would go on to help establish the team in the top flight and  remained with the club when they moved to Xi'an and renamed itself Xi'an Chanba International. During this period Li Yan established himself as useful attacking midfielder and caught the eye of New Zealand Knights FC in 2006, however his move was to prove an unsuccessful one and he only played in two league games. Li Yan would return to Xian Chanba International which had renamed itself Shaanxi Baorong Chanba in the 2007 season and stayed with them until the end of the 2009 league season when he transferred to Hangzhou Greentown in 2010. His move to Hangzhou would see him become an immediate regular within the team and he helped guide the club to their best ever finish of fourth within the league as well qualification for the AFC Champions League for the first time. Li would, however sustain an ankle injury at the beginning of the 2011 league season and tried to play on until April 19, 2011 in a 2011 AFC Champions League group game against Al Ain S.C.C. saw him unable to carry on, which would see him retire soon afterwards.

International career
Li Yan would make his debut in a friendly against Republic of Ireland March 29, 2005 in a 1–0 defeat. He would go on to establish himself as a squad regular within the team and score his first goal against Korea DPR in a 2–0 win. Li Yan, however did not make it into the squad that went to the 2007 AFC Asian Cup and after the tournament saw very little international playing time.

Honours

Club
Shanghai Pudong
Chinese Jia-B League: 2001

International
China national football team
East Asian Football Championship: 2005

References

External links

1980 births
Living people
Chinese footballers
Footballers from Shanghai
China international footballers
Beijing Renhe F.C. players
A-League Men players
New Zealand Knights FC players
Expatriate association footballers in New Zealand
Chinese expatriate footballers
Zhejiang Professional F.C. players
Chinese Super League players
Association football midfielders